Imants is a Latvian masculine given name, from the Livonian language: im meaning "miracle" added to and meaning "gift". The name is borne by more than 6,250 men in Latvia. Its nameday is celebrated on 1 July.

The name is one of the relatively few surviving Latvian names of indigenous origin from among the great number revived or introduced during the Latvian National Awakening of the late 19th and early 20th centuries.

According to the Latvian calendar, the name day for Imants is July 1.

Individuals
The name Imants may refer to the following:

Imants Barušs, Canadian professor of psychology
Imants Bleidelis (born 1975), Latvian footballer
Imants Bodnieks (born 1941), Latvian racing cyclist
Imants Kalniņš (born 1941), Latvian composer
Imants Kokars (1921–2011), Latvian music pedagogue and conductor
Imants Lancmanis (born 1941), Latvian art historian
Imants Lešinskis (born 1935), KGB agent
Imants Lieģis (born 1955), Latvian ambassador
Imants Priede (born 1948), British-Latvian zoologist, author and academic
Imants Sudmalis (1916–1944), Latvian communist and Soviet partisan
Imants Tillers (born 1950), Australian artist
Imants Zemzaris (born 1951), Latvian composer
Imants Ziedonis (born 1933), Latvian poet

Notes

Sources
 Pilsonības un Migrācijas Lietu Parvalde (PMLP): Office of Citizenship and Migration Affairs personal name database

References
 Latkovskis, Leonards, 1971: Latgalu uzvordi, palames un dzymtas II. Munich: Latgalu izdevniecība 
 Siliņš, K., 1990: Latviešu personvārdu vārdnīca. Rīga: Zinātne 

Latvian masculine given names
Uralic personal names